David Efianayi (born December 19, 1995) is an American basketball player who plays guard for Hapoel Be'er Sheva in the Israeli Basketball Premier League. He played college basketball at Gardner-Webb University.

Early life
Efianayi was born in Manchester, Connecticut, and raised in Orlando, Florida, after moving there in the fifth grade.

He played high school basketball at Ocoee High School ('14) in Ocoee, Florida. He was named All-County Honorable Mention by the Orlando Sentinel in his junior year.

College career
He played college basketball at Gardner-Webb University ('19) from 2015 to 2019. In 2017-18 he scored 17.5 points per game (3rd in the Big South), had an .807 free throw percentage (6th), and had 1.2 steals per game (10th). In 2018-19 he scored 18.2 points per game (5th in the Big South), and had 0.7 blocks per game (7th). Efianayi was named twice to the Sports Classic Indianapolis Subregional Team, All-Big South Honorable Mention Team in 2017, to the All-Big South Second Team in 2018 and 2019, to the National Association of Basketball Coaches All-District (3) Second Team in 2019, and to the Big South All-Tournament Team in 2019. In 2020, he was named to the Big South Conference Men's Basketball All-Decade Team (2010–19).

Professional career
In 2019-20 Efianayi played for the Bakken Bears in Basketligaen in Denmark. In 2020-21 he played for Horsens IC in Basketligaen, averaging 20.2 points per game (second in the league). In 2021-22 he played for Denain ASC Voltaire in LNB Pro B in France.

In 2022-23 Efianayi plays guard for Hapoel Be'er Sheva in the Israeli Basketball Premier League, having signed with the team on July 5, 2022.

References 

1995 births
Living people
21st-century African-American sportspeople
African-American basketball players
American expatriate basketball people in Denmark
American expatriate basketball people in France
American expatriate basketball people in Israel
American men's basketball players
Gardner–Webb Runnin' Bulldogs men's basketball players
Guards (basketball)
Hapoel Be'er Sheva B.C. players
Israeli Basketball Premier League players
Sportspeople from Manchester, Connecticut
Basketball players from Connecticut
Basketball players from Orlando, Florida